Ek Jhalak is a 1957 Bollywood film starring Pradeep Kumar, Rajendra Kumar, Vyjayanthimala, Anita Guha in lead roles.

Cast 
Pradeep Kumar 
Rajendra Kumar
Vyjayanthimala
Anita Guha

Music 
S. H. Bihari had penned the lyrics while Hemant Kumar had composed the music.

References

External links

1957 films
Films scored by Hemant Kumar
1950s Hindi-language films